The 1937 Major League Baseball season was contested from April 19 to October 10, 1937. The New York Giants and New York Yankees were the regular season champions of the National League and American League, respectively. In a rematch of the prior year's postseason, the Yankees then defeated the Giants in the World Series, four games to one.

Awards and honors
Baseball Hall of Fame
Morgan Bulkeley
Ban Johnson
Nap Lajoie
Connie Mack
John McGraw
Tris Speaker
George Wright
Cy Young
MLB Most Valuable Player Award
American League:  Charlie Gehringer, Detroit Tigers, 2B
National League:  Joe Medwick, St. Louis Cardinals, OF
The Sporting News Player of the Year Award
Johnny Allen Cleveland Indians
The Sporting News Manager of the Year Award
Bill McKechnie Boston Bees

Statistical leaders

Standings

American League

National League

Postseason

Bracket

Managers

American League

National League

Home Field Attendance

References

External links
1937 Major League Baseball season schedule at Baseball Reference

 
Major League Baseball seasons